Adeline Rispal (born 1955 in Aurillac) is a French architect, exhibit designer, scenographer and museologist specialising in designing complex cultural and heritage projects.

Rispal was educated at École nationale supérieure des Beaux-Arts at the University of Paris, from where she graduated in 1981.

In 1982, Rispal joined the Jean Nouvel agency where she spent much of her time on the design and museography of the Arab World Institute. In 1990 she co-founded Repérages with Jean-Jacques Raynaud and Louis Tournoux and Jean-Michel Laterrade. In 2010 she founded her own practice, Studio Adeline Rispal.

Rispal was a finalist in the designs for the National September 11 Memorial & Museum in New York in 2007, and the Louvre Abu Dhabi in 2008. The interior of the French pavilion at Expo 2015 in Milan was created by Rispal.  Amy Frearson noted in a Dezeen article that this interior was meant to resemble a typical French covered market. In 2016 it was announced that Rispal would work with Mossessian Architecture on the Makkah Museum of the Islamic Faith in Mecca.

A member of the Académie d'architecture, in 2014 Rispal was awarded their Silver Medal. She was made a Knight of the Order of Agricultural Merit for her outstanding service to French agriculture as part of Expo 2015. Rispal is a member of the High Council of Museums of France since 2014.

Since 2013, Rispal has run the cross-disciplinary blog invisibl.eu/, devoted to teaching and disseminating information relating to exhibition architecture.

In 2019, Adeline Rispal co-founded XPO, Fédération des Concepteurs d’Expositions, whose mission is to represent, promote and defend the various trades of exhibition design while advocating for a collaborative and sustainable approach to the design and production.

References

External links 
 Ateliers Adeline Rispal's website
 The blog invisibl.eu about architecture, founded by Rispal in 2013
 A video of the Expo 2015 building

Living people
1955 births
People from Aurillac
French women architects
20th-century French architects
21st-century French architects
École des Beaux-Arts alumni
French scenic designers
University of Paris alumni
Members of the Académie d'architecture
Knights of the Order of Agricultural Merit
20th-century French women
21st-century French women